William Sampson Jr. (September 27, 1933 – June 3, 1987) was a Muscogee painter, actor, and rodeo performer. He is best known for his performance as the apparently deaf and mute Chief Bromden, the title role in One Flew Over the Cuckoo's Nest and as Crazy Horse in the 1977 western The White Buffalo, as well as his roles as Taylor in Poltergeist II: The Other Side and Ten Bears in 1976's The Outlaw Josey Wales.

Life and career 
William “Will” Sampson Jr., born in Okmulgee County, Oklahoma to William "Wiley" Sampson Sr. (1904–2001) and Mabel Sampson (née Lewis, 1899–1997), was a member of the Muscogee, a people from the Southeastern Woodlands. Sampson Jr. had at least five children: Samsoche "Sam" and Lumhe "Micco" Sampson (of the Sampson Brothers Duo), actor Timothy "Tim" James Sampson, Robert Benjamin Sampson. The Sampson Brothers Duo are known for their traditional fancy and grass dances, and often perform with Frank Waln, a notable Lakota hip-hop artist. His son Robert was murdered in Tulsa in 2013.

Rodeo performer 
Sampson competed in rodeos for about 20 years. His specialty was bronco busting, and he was on the rodeo circuit when producers Saul Zaentz and Michael Douglas — of One Flew Over the Cuckoo's Nest — were looking for a large Native American to play the role of Chief Bromden. Sampson stood an imposing 6'7" (2.01 m) tall. Rodeo announcer Mel Lambert mentioned Sampson to them, and after lengthy efforts to find him, they hired him on the strength of an interview. He had never acted before.

Actor 
Sampson's most notable roles were as Chief Bromden in One Flew Over the Cuckoo's Nest and as Taylor the Medicine Man in the horror film Poltergeist II. He had a recurring role on the TV series Vega$ as Harlon Twoleaf, and starred in the movies Fish Hawk, The Outlaw Josey Wales, and Orca. Sampson appeared in the production of Black Elk Speaks with the American Indian Theater Company in Tulsa, Oklahoma, where David Carradine and other Native American actors (such as Wes Studi and Randolph Mantooth) have appeared in stage productions. He also played Crazy Horse in The White Buffalo with Charles Bronson and the archetypal Elevator Attendant in Nicolas Roeg's 1985 film, Insignificance.

Artist 
Sampson was a visual artist. His large painting depicting the Ribbon Dance of the Muscogee (Creek) is in the collection of the Creek Council House Museum in Okmulgee, Oklahoma. His artwork has been shown at the Gilcrease Museum and the Philbrook Museum of Art.

Death 
Sampson suffered from scleroderma, a chronic degenerative condition that affected his heart, lungs, and skin. After undergoing a heart and lung transplant at Houston Methodist Hospital in Houston, he died on June 3, 1987, of post-operative kidney failure. Sampson was 53 years old. Sampson was interred at Graves Creek Cemetery in Hitchita, Oklahoma.

Legacy 
Will Sampson Road, in Okmulgee County (east of Highway 75 near Preston, Oklahoma), is named after him. 

During the filming of The White Buffalo, Sampson halted production by refusing to act when he discovered that producers had hired white actors to portray Native Americans for the film. In 1983, with assistance from his personal secretary Zoe Escobar, Sampson founded the "American Indian Registry for the Performing Arts" for Native American actors. He also served on the registry's Board of Directors.

Sampson's son Tim Sampson appeared on the FX show It's Always Sunny in Philadelphia season four episode "Sweet Dee Has a Heart Attack". The episode pays homage to Sampson's work as Chief Bromden in One Flew Over the Cuckoo's Nest; Tim plays "Tonto" after Frank (Danny DeVito) is mistaken as mentally incompetent and placed within a facility.

Filmography

Awards and nominations 
 Genie Award 1980: Nominated, "Best Performance by a Foreign Actor" – Fish Hawk

Notes

Bibliography 
 Escobar, Zoe (2009). Beyond the Cuckoo's Nest: the Art and Life of William 'Sonny' Sampson, Jr., the Muscogee Creek Indian Cowboy, Painter and Actor Girldog Publishing, Issaquah, Washington. ISBN 978-0-615-18164-6

External links 

Will Sampson interviews
Will Sampson: Documentary Ensures Actor is Remembered. The Aboriginal Multi-Media Society (AMMSA)

The Great Spirit within The Hole, Twin Cities PBS.
Liutova, S. N. Beyond Cuckoo's Nest, or Composing one's book (In Russ.)

1933 births
1987 deaths
People from Okmulgee, Oklahoma
American male film actors
American male television actors
Native American male actors
Native American painters
Male actors from Oklahoma
Muscogee people
Deaths from kidney failure
Artists from Oklahoma
20th-century American male actors
20th-century Native Americans
Native American actors